Charles Elwood Stephenson AKA C.E.S.(October 11, 1898 - April 1, 1965) was a Canadian politician. He served as mayor of Port Hope, Ontario and as a Progressive Conservative Member of Parliament in the House of Commons of Canada from 1945 to 1949.

Stepenson was a farmer, merchant and store owner. He was elected mayor in 1943 and then ran in the 1945 federal election in Durham and was elected. He was narrowly defeated in his bid for re-election in 1949 and again in 1953.

References
 

1898 births
1965 deaths
Mayors of places in Ontario
Members of the House of Commons of Canada from Ontario
Progressive Conservative Party of Canada MPs